Hickory Corners is an unincorporated community in Chester County, Tennessee, United States.

Geography

Hickory Corners is located on Tennessee State Route 225 south of Montezuma, Tennessee and the Silerton Road. The Old Friendship Road is on the Southeastern side of Hickory Corners community.

History
The Hickory Corner School was built in 1914. The school property had a large Hickory Tree on each corner, therefore the school and community became known as Hickory Corners. Today there is a very active Community Center located at 465 Laurel Hill Road, Tennessee State Route 225 (SR 225). There is no Post Office in Hickory Corners; it, along with most of Chester County is served out of the Post Office in Henderson, Tennessee.

Notes

Unincorporated communities in Chester County, Tennessee
Unincorporated communities in Tennessee